PRSS may refer to:

 Pasir Ris Secondary School, a school in Singapore
 Public Radio Satellite System, the satellite uplink facility used by public radio stations in the United States
 Pakistan Remote Sensing Satellite, the Chinese-built remote sensing satellite for Pakistan
 Power Rangers Super Samurai, 20th season of the Power Rangers television franchise
 CafePress, an online retailer of stock and user-customized on demand products.

See also
 PRS (disambiguation)